Antonio María Cascajares y Azara (2 March 1834 – 27 July 1901) was a Spanish Roman Catholic cardinal, archbishop of Valladolid and archbishop-elect of Zaragoza.

Biography
He was born in Calanda, Teruel Province, Aragon. He joined the military in 1846 and retired with the rank of captain in 1857, to follow his ecclesiastical studies leading to a licentiate in theology and canon law. He was ordained priest in 1861. He served  in Zaragoza, Toledo and Burgos. He was elected titular bishop of Dora and named prelate of Ciudad Real on 27 March 1882. He transferred to the see of Calahorra y La Calzada on 27 March 1884 and was promoted to the metropolitan see of Valladolid on 17 December 1891.

Pope Leo XIII created him cardinal priest in the consistory on 29 November 1895, with the title of Sant'Eusebio. He opted for the title of Sant'Agostino on 24 March 1898. He was elected archbishop of Zaragoza on 18 April 1901 but he died (before taking possession of the see) on 27 July 1901 in Calahorra. He was buried in Calanda - his birthplace.

Footnotes

External links
The Cardinals of the Holy Roman Church - Biographical Dictionary 
Catholic Hierarchy data for this cardinal 

1834 births
1901 deaths
People from Calanda
19th-century Spanish cardinals
Archbishops of Zaragoza
20th-century Spanish cardinals
Cardinals created by Pope Leo XIII